Bluett (or Bluet) Wallop (27 April 1726 – 6 June 1749) was a British soldier and politician.

The fourth son of John Wallop, 1st Earl of Portsmouth, Bluett was appointed a Page of Honour to George II on 8 November 1739. He served the King on campaign in Flanders in 1743 and 1744. In the latter year, he left the King's service, having obtained a commission as a cornet in Honywood's Regiment of Horse. He was with his regiment at Fontenoy, and soon thereafter got a captaincy in Lord Sempill's Regiment of Foot. He fought at Culloden, and later got the captaincy of a troop of horse and served as equerry to the Duke of Cumberland.

In 1747, he was returned to Parliament as a member for Newport, Isle of Wight, owing to his father's influence as Governor of the Isle of Wight. He died of smallpox in 1749.

References

1726 births
1749 deaths
1st King's Dragoon Guards officers
42nd Regiment of Foot officers
British Army personnel of the Jacobite rising of 1745
British Army personnel of the War of the Austrian Succession
British MPs 1747–1754
Deaths from smallpox
Members of Parliament for Newport (Isle of Wight)
Bluett
Younger sons of earls